Graham John Reid (born 9 April 1964) is a former Australian field hockey player who played as a defender and midfielder for the Australian national team. He managed the Indian men's national team that won a bronze medal at the 2020 Summer Olympics.

He was a member of the team that won the silver medal at the 1992 Summer Olympics in Barcelona, Spain. Afterwards he played club hockey for the Dutch top team Amsterdam for two seasons (1993, 1994) returning in 1995 to play the Europa cup.

Reid played 130 internationals for Australia scoring 36 goals including two Olympic Games (1988, 1992), one World Cup (1990) and nine Champions Trophies (1984, 85, 86, 87, 88, 89, 90, 91, and 92). He has also won the Olympians medal (WA Best and Fairest medal) 3 times (1995, 96, and 98) whilst playing for Victoria Park Panthers.

He wasan inaugural member of the Australian Institute of Sport (AIS) hockey unit in Perth, Western Australia in 1984 and despite stints back in Queensland, Amsterdam and Bangalore, Reid has his home in Perth. He and his wife Julia have two children, Scott (1998) and Emma (1997).

Managerial career
In 2009, he was appointed assistant coach of the Australian Men's Hockey Team (Kookaburras).
During this time he was given the opportunity to take on the head coach position for the Champions Trophy in Melbourne in 2012. He guided the team to their 5th consecutive Champions Trophy gold medal. In October 2013 he was given another opportunity to lead the Kookaburras at the Oceania Cup in Stratford, New Zealand. Here the Kookaburras won the Oceania Cup by defeating New Zealand 5 - 2 in the final and qualified for the 2014 World Cup in Den Haag. 
.

In 2014 he and Paul Gaudoin co-coached the Kookaburras to a gold medal at the Commonwealth Games in Glasgow. In September 2014 he was announced as the head coach of the Kookaburras following the retirement of Ric Charlesworth.

During 2015 the Kookaburras continued their successful reign as world number 1 with qualification for the 2016 Rio Olympics by winning the World League Semi-Final tournament in Antwerp after beating Belgium after the final whistle. The World League final was held in December 2015 in Raipur, India. Australia again was victorious in the final of this competition defeating Belgium again, capturing the only World title to have alluded Australia.

On 21 November 2015 Graham was inducted into the Queensland Hockey Hall of Fame.

In the Olympic year, the Kookaburras won the 14th Champions Trophy held in London in June 2016. It was Reid's 2nd Champions Trophy title as head coach.  It finished controversially after Australia defeated India in the final after sudden death penalty shootouts (3-1).

After the 2016 Summer Olympics, he stepped down as the Australia head coach and in 2017 he became the head coach of his former club Amsterdam and the assistant coach of the Dutch national team. In March 2019, he was dismissed as Amsterdam coach after an 8–2 loss to HGC in the league and alleged interest from the Indian national team for his services.

Coach of Indian men's team 
In April 2019 he was appointed as the head coach of the Indian national team, which also meant he had to leave his position as assistant coach of the Dutch national team.

At the Tokyo Olympics, under his coaching, the Indian team won the bronze medal, defeating Germany in the bronze-medal match. It was India's first podium finish in field hockey after the 1980 Olympics.

He was the coach at the 2021 Men's FIH Hockey Junior World Cup held in Bhubaneswar where the team finished fourth.

He stepped down as Indian men's hockey team chief coach following poor performance of Indian team in 2023 Men's FIH Hockey World Cup. He is holding the record for longest service coach of Indian National Hockey Team.

References

External links
 
 
 
 
 

1964 births
Living people
Australian male field hockey players
Male field hockey defenders
Male field hockey midfielders
Olympic field hockey players of Australia
Olympic silver medalists for Australia
Olympic medalists in field hockey
Field hockey players at the 1988 Summer Olympics
Field hockey players at the 1992 Summer Olympics
Medalists at the 1992 Summer Olympics
Sportsmen from Queensland
Amsterdamsche Hockey & Bandy Club players
1990 Men's Hockey World Cup players
Australian Olympic coaches
Australian expatriate sportspeople in India